Daniel Dhers (born March 25, 1985, in Caracas, Venezuela) is a Venezuelan professional BMX rider. He is currently sponsored by Red Bull, POC, DC Shoes, Specialized, Albe's Mailorder, and Verizon. Dhers lived in Greenville, North Carolina, known as Protown USA because of the concentration of BMX riders that live there, including Dave Mirra.
Dhers in 2013 opened in Holly Springs, North Carolina a public mountain biking, BMX, and skateboarding park, the Daniel Dhers Action Sports Complex.

Career
Dhers began riding BMX when he was twelve years old in Caracas to socialize with friends and in 1998 he visited his first skatepark. Then, he started traveling to different countries  to compete and gain experience. In 2003, he entered his first contest. In 2006, Dhers went to the United States and won the Dew Action Sports Tour, which he would win again in 2007, 2008, and 2010. He would also win gold medals at the X Games in 2007, 2008, and 2010. He was featured on several episodes of the American TV program Nitro Circus. He has traveled the world competing and promoting the sport.

Dhers is one of the most decorated BMX riders of all time.

Daniel Dhers Action Sports Complex
In 2013 Dhers and Abel Zalcberg founded the Daniel Dhers Action Sports Complex, which opened on May 3, 2014 in North Carolina. The 37,000-square-foot  family-oriented BMX, scooter and skateboarding facility includes both indoor and outdoor parks.

References

External links
 
 
 AST Dew Tour Profile
 Daniel Dhers Action Sports Complex

1985 births
Living people
X Games athletes
BMX riders
Sportspeople from Caracas
Venezuelan male cyclists
People from Holly Springs, North Carolina
Pan American Games medalists in cycling
Pan American Games gold medalists for Venezuela
Cyclists at the 2019 Pan American Games
Medalists at the 2019 Pan American Games
Cyclists at the 2020 Summer Olympics
Olympic cyclists of Venezuela
Medalists at the 2020 Summer Olympics
Olympic medalists in cycling
Olympic silver medalists for Venezuela